Masefako Clarah Dikgale is a South African politician who was a Member of the National Assembly of South Africa from 2019 to 2023. Prior to serving in the National Assembly, she served as a permanent delegate to the National Council of Provinces from Limpopo from 2009 to 2019. Dikgale is a member of the African National Congress.

Education
Dikgale graduated from the University of Limpopo with a honours degree in education. She completed a PALAMA leadership and governance short course with the University of South Africa and the University of the Witwatersrand.

Political career
Dikgale served as the secretary of the ANC Women's League of the ANC Manyoro branch in ward 33 in the Polokwane Local Municipality. She is current chairperson of the ANC's Charles Rawane branch in Ga-Dikgale in Polokwane under the Mankweng Cluster. Dikgale is the current national treasurer of the Congress of Traditional Leaders of South Africa and the current chairperson of CONTRALESA's women's wing in Limpopo.

Parliamentary career

National Council of Provinces
In 2009, she was elected as an ANC permanent delegate to the National Council of Provinces from Limpopo. She was re-elected in 2014. She was then elected House Chairperson for International Relations and Members Interests.

Committee memberships
Select Committee on Trade and International Relations
Select Committee on Appropriations
Select Committee on Economic Development
Select Committee on Finance
Ad Hoc Committee on General Intelligence Laws Amendment Bill
Joint Standing Committee on Defence
Select Committee on Economic and Business Development
Ad Hoc Committee on the Review of Parmed

National Assembly of South Africa
In 2019, she stood for election to the South African National Assembly as 3rd on the ANC's Limpopo list. At the election, Dikgale won a seat in the National Assembly.

Dikgale was one of four ANC MPs who resigned parliament in late-January and early-February 2023 to make way for newly elected members of the ANC national leadership to be sworn in.

Committee memberships
Rules of the National Assembly
Standing Committee on Appropriations
Constitutional Review Committee 
Joint Standing Committee on Intelligence

Personal life
Isaac Lesiba Maphotho, Cassel Mathale, Soviet Lekganyane, Thandi Modise, Baleka Mbete, Stanley Mathabatha, Rosina Semenya and Maite Nkoana-Mashabane are her political idols. Her interests include reading, singing and talking.

References

External links
Dikgale, Masefako Clarah at African National Congress Parliamentary Caucus

Living people
Year of birth missing (living people)
People from Limpopo
Members of the National Council of Provinces
Women members of the National Council of Provinces
Members of the National Assembly of South Africa
Women members of the National Assembly of South Africa
African National Congress politicians